Kidwell is an unincorporated community in Tyler County, West Virginia, United States, along Point Pleasant Creek.  It was also known as Glendenning. The Glendenning post office is closed.

References 

Unincorporated communities in West Virginia
Unincorporated communities in Tyler County, West Virginia